Robert Ferguson was an English professional footballer who played as a centre forward.

Career
Ferguson played for Bradford City.

For Bradford City he made 9 appearances in the Football League, scoring 3 goals.

Sources

References

Year of birth missing
Year of death missing
English footballers
Bradford City A.F.C. players
English Football League players
Association football forwards